Eudonia decorella is a species of moth in the family Crambidae. It is found on the Canary Islands and Madeira.

References

Moths described in 1859
Eudonia